A vascular bundle is a part of the transport system in vascular plants. The transport itself happens in the stem, which exists in two forms: xylem and phloem. Both these tissues are present in a vascular bundle, which in addition will include supporting and protective tissues. In addition, there is also a tissue between xylem and phloem which is the cambium.

The xylem typically lies towards the axis (adaxial) with phloem positioned away from the axis (abaxial). In a stem or root this means that the xylem is closer to the centre of the stem or root while the phloem is closer to the exterior. In a leaf, the adaxial surface of the leaf will usually be the upper side, with the abaxial surface the lower side.  

The sugars synthesized by the plant with sun light are transported by the phloem, which is closer to the lower surface.  Aphids  and leaf hoppers feed off of these sugars by tapping into the phloem.  This is why aphids and leaf hoppers are typically found on the underside of a leaf rather than on the top. 
The position of vascular bundles relative to each other may vary considerably: see stele.

Bundle-sheath cells
The bundle-sheath cells are the photosynthetic cells arranged into a tightly packed sheath around the vein of a leaf. It forms a protective covering on leaf vein, and consist of one or more cell layers, usually parenchyma. Loosely arranged mesophyll cells lie between the bundle sheath and the leaf surface. The Calvin cycle is confined to the chloroplasts of these bundle sheath cells in C4 plants. C2 plants also use a variation of this structure.

References

Further reading
Campbell, N. A. & Reece, J. B. (2005). Photosynthesis. Biology (7th ed.). San Francisco: Benjamin Cummings.

External links
Curtis, Lersten, and Nowak cross section of a vascular bundle
Mauseth another cross section of a vascular bundle

  

Plant anatomy
Plant physiology
Tissues (biology)